thyssenkrupp Materials Services GmbH (tkMX) is the lead company of the business area of the same name and part of the diversified German industrial group thyssenkrupp AG. Materials Services is a global materials distributor as well as a technical and infrastructural service provider for the B2B-sector. The total revenue in the fiscal year 2015/2016 was 11.88 billion Euro.

Company structure 
thyssenkrupp Materials Services is divided in three so-called business units - Materials Distribution, Supply Chain Services and Special Materials. Over 19,700 employees work for the 81 Materials Services subsidiaries at around 480 branches in more than 40 countries.

Main customers are located in Europe and North America. They are specialist retailers and companies of the automotive sector or the metal processing industry.

Digital transformation 
Materials Services runs a Digital Transformation Office (DTO). The DTO forwards the business area’s digitalization goals. The strategy includes a progressive addition of e-commerce models as well as a cultural change to an integral and collaborative work environment.

The online shop "materials4me" was launched in Great Britain, Germany, Spain and Switzerland in 2016. The target group of materials4me are do-it-yourselfers, educational institutions as well as small and medium businesses. There are also two B2B-portals. "Materials Services Online-Portal" grants access to order documents, among others, for key accounts. On the website "onlinelaserworks" customers can upload CAD drawings to have blanks fully automatically cut to size.

At the Hannover trade fair thyssenkrupp announced the opening of a production center for Additive Manufacturing (3D-printing) in the city Mülheim in 2017.

In 2017, Materials Services also announced the self-developed platform "toii" in line with the Industrial Internet of Things (IIoT). This system is compatible with old and new machines from different manufactures. The tool should accelerate the automation of the production operations as well as make processes much more efficient.

References

External links 

 Website thyssenkrupp Materials Services
 Website thyssenkrupp AG

ThyssenKrupp
Service companies of Germany
Companies with year of establishment missing